Vítonice may refer to:

 Vítonice (Znojmo District), a village in the Czech Republic
 Vítonice (Kroměříž District), a village in the Czech Republic